Streptomyces malaysiensis is a streptomycete bacterium species. At maturity, the aerial hyphae of this species differentiates into tight, spiral chains of rugose, cylindrical spores. Its type strain is ATB-11T.

References

Further reading

External links

LPSN
Type strain of Streptomyces malaysiensis at BacDive -  the Bacterial Diversity Metadatabase

malaysiensis